Christiane Mitterwallner (born 10 July 1974, in Schladming) is an Austrian former alpine skier who competed in the 1998 Winter Olympics.

External links
 sports-reference.com
 

1974 births
Living people
Austrian female alpine skiers
Olympic alpine skiers of Austria

Alpine skiers at the 1998 Winter Olympics
People from Liezen District